Abacetus ceylanicus is a species of ground beetle in the subfamily Pterostichinae. It was described by Nietner in 1858.

References

ceylanicus
Beetles described in 1858